Viktor Poganovsky (born 23 November 1949) is a Ukrainian Soviet equestrian and Olympic champion. He was in the equestrian school from the age of 12.

In 1965, he took a part in the national competitions among youth and was included in the national team. In 1976, finished studying at Sukhomlynskyi Mykolaiv National University. Presented "Kolos" (Mykolaiv). He became the USSR champion 20 times, SSR champion 15 times, repeatedly won in international competitions.

He won a gold medal in show jumping with the Soviet team at the 1980 Summer Olympics in Moscow.

He has been a main trainer in Mykolaiv Equestrian School since 1992.

References

External links

1949 births
Living people
Ukrainian male equestrians
Soviet male equestrians
Olympic equestrians of the Soviet Union
Olympic gold medalists for the Soviet Union
Equestrians at the 1980 Summer Olympics
Olympic medalists in equestrian
Medalists at the 1980 Summer Olympics